Habibur Rahman Sohag (born 1 January 1993) is a Bangladeshi footballer who last played for Bangladeshi club Sheikh Russel KC and the Bangladesh national team. A versatile player, Sohag played in multiple roles, including central midfielder and attacking midfielder, but currently plays as a centre-back or defensive midfielder.

International career

Sohag was first called up for the Bangladesh national team at the 2021 Three Nations Cup. He made his debut on 27 March, coming on as a substitute against hosts Nepal in a 0–0 draw.

Honours
Dhaka Abahani
 Bangladesh Premier League: 2009–10
 Bangladesh Federation Cup: 2010
 Bangladesh Super Cup: 2010
 Bordoloi Trophy: 2010
Arambagh
 Independence Cup: 2017–18

References

External links
 
 

Living people
1993 births
Bangladeshi footballers
Association football midfielders
Sheikh Russel KC players
Abahani Limited (Dhaka) players
Arambagh KS players
Muktijoddha Sangsad KC players
Bangladesh Football Premier League players
Mohammedan SC (Dhaka) players
Bangladesh international footballers